Joachim Horn-Bernges is a German songwriter and music producer who has competed in the Eurovision Song Contest several times and for different countries. In 1989 he competed for both Germany and Austria.

Songwriting credits (selected) 
 Nino de Angelo - "Flieger"
 Nino de Angelo - "Jenseits von Eden"
 Ich Troje - "Keine Grenzen - Żadnych granic"
 Thomas Forstner - "Nur ein Lied"
 Tony Wegas - "Zusammen geh'n"

See also 
 Category Songs written by Joachim Horn-Bernges

References

External links 
 Joachim Horn-Bernges, Discogs. Retrieved 11 January 2019
 Texter Joachim Horn-Bernges aus Gera: „Schlagerinterpreten sind Kanonenfutter“, Thüringer Allgemeine. Retrieved 11 January 2019 (German)

German songwriters
German record producers
Living people
1949 births